The Russian Women's Water Polo Championship is the premier championship for women's water polo clubs in Russia. Founded in 1992 following the breakup of the Soviet Union, it is currently contested by ten teams. 

Kinef Kirishi is the competition's most successful team, having won its last 19 editions. Double European champion SKIF Izmaylovo and Uralochka Zlatoust also dominated the competition in previous years.

List of champions

Titles by club

2018-19 teams
 Diana Saint Petersburg
 Kazakhstan Junior
 Kinef Kirishi
 Kinef Kirishi – 2
 Olimp Nizhny-Novgorod
 SKIF Moscow
 Shturm Ruza
 Spartak Volgograd
 Uralochka Zlatoust
 Yugra Khanty-Mansiysk

References

Water polo competitions in Russia
Rus
Women's sports leagues in Russia
National championships in Russia
Professional sports leagues in Russia